The Photons was a punk/new wave band active between 1977 and 1978.  They are most notable for their vocalist Steve Strange, who went on to form Visage.  Two of Visage's early singles, "Tar" and "Mind of a Toy", were originally Photons' songs.

Other notable members include Mark Ryan, Vince Ely who later joined the Psychedelic Furs and David Littler, formerly of the Spitfire Boys.

Between December 1977 and January 1978, the Photons and the Moors Murderers, another one of Steve Strange's projects, were essentially the same band, with frequent personnel swaps between the two.

References

English new wave musical groups
English punk rock groups
Musical groups disestablished in 1978
Musical groups established in 1977